Hartgert "Harrie" Langman (23 February 1931 – 1 August 2016) was a Dutch politician of the People's Party for Freedom and Democracy (VVD). 

He died on 1 August 2016.

References

External links
Official

  Mr.Drs. H. (Harrie) Langman Parlement & Politiek

1931 births
2016 deaths
Dutch economists
Dutch bankers
Dutch businesspeople
Dutch corporate directors
Dutch nonprofit directors
Dutch chief executives in the finance industry
Financial economists
Ministers of Economic Affairs of the Netherlands
People's Party for Freedom and Democracy politicians
Vrije Universiteit Amsterdam alumni
Academic staff of Erasmus University Rotterdam
Commanders of the Order of Orange-Nassau
Knights of the Order of the Netherlands Lion
Royal Netherlands Army personnel
Reformed Churches Christians from the Netherlands
Protestant Church Christians from the Netherlands
People from Heerenveen
People from Drachten